This is a list of notable Romanian-Americans, including both original immigrants from Romania who obtained American citizenship and their American descendants.

Academics

Literary Critics 
Matei Călinescu – professor at Indiana University Bloomington

Mathematicians 
Alexandra Bellow – mathematician, Professor Emeritus at Northwestern University
Ana Caraiani – mathematician, member of the American Mathematical Society
Ioana Dumitriu  – mathematician, professor at the University of Washington
Ciprian Foias – mathematician, distinguished professor at Texas A&M University
Tudor Ganea – mathematician, known for his work in algebraic topology
Nicholas Georgescu-Roegen – mathematician, statistician, and economist
Matei Machedon  – mathematician, professor at the University of Maryland
Ciprian Manolescu – mathematician, professor at Stanford University
Irina Mitrea – mathematician, professor at Temple University 
Mircea Mustaţă – mathematician, professor at the University of Michigan
Florian Pop – mathematician, professor at the University of Pennsylvania
Mihnea Popa – mathematician, professor at Northwestern University
Sorin Popa – mathematician, professor at the University of California, Los Angeles
Cristian Dumitru Popescu – mathematician, professor at the University of California, San Diego
Ovidiu Savin – mathematician, professor at Columbia University
Rodica Simion – mathematician, known for her work in combinatorics
Ileana Streinu – mathematician, professor at Smith College
Bogdan Suceavă – mathematician, professor at California State University Fullerton
Dan-Virgil Voiculescu – mathematician, professor at the University of California, Berkeley
Alexandru Zaharescu – mathematician, professor at the University of Illinois at Urbana–Champaign

Historians, sociologists and philosophers 
 Eugene Borza – professor of history at Pennsylvania State University
Ioan Petru Culianu – historian of religion 
Mircea Eliade – philosopher, writer, historian of religions
 Radu Florescu – emeritus professor of history at Boston College

Art 

 Art Garfunkel – musician
 Eugen Ciucă – sculptor
 Noche Crist – painter
 Christopher Georgesco – sculptor
 Cristian Gheorghiu – contemporary artist
 Ami James – tattoo artist
 De Hirsh Margules – painter (Romanian-Jewish descent)
 Alexandra Nechita – cubist painter

Architects 
 Max Abramovitz – architect of Avery Fisher Hall, of Romanian-Jewish descent
 Haralamb H. Georgescu – architect

Business 
 Micky Arison – chairman of Carnival Corporation and owner of NBA's Miami Heat
 Jeffrey Brotman – co-founder of Costco Wholesale Corporation (Romanian-Jewish descent)
 Safra Catz – CEO of Oracle Corporation 
 Dan Dascalescu – entrepreneur, co-founder of Blueseed 
 John DeLorean – engineer, founder of the DeLorean Motor Company
 Peter Georgescu – chairman emeritus of Young & Rubicam 
 Michael Horodniceanu – engineer and businessman, former president of MTA Capital Construction 
 Stephanie Korey – co-founder and executive chairman of Away 
 David Marcus – former President of PayPal, and current Vice President of Messaging Products at Facebook
 Martin Bud Seretean –  founder, and former CEO of Coronet Industries.
 Anastasia Soare – CEO and founder of Anastasia Beverly Hills
 Christine Valmy – founded the first esthetician school in the United States

Entertainment

Actors 
 Sadie Alexandru – actress
 Lauren Bacall – actress (Romanian Jewish mother)
 Bob Balaban – actor (part Romanian-Jewish descent)
 Jillian Bell – actress and screenwriter
 Tim Conway – actor and comedian (Romanian mother)
 Melinda Culea – actress
 Fran Drescher – actress and comedian (part Romanian-Jewish descent)
 Illeana Douglas – actress
Jennifer Ehle – actress
 Lisa Ferraday – actress
 Ana Gasteyer – actress and comedian
 Joseph Gordon-Levitt – actor (part Romanian-Jewish descent)
 Oana Gregory – actress
 Dustin Hoffman – actor and filmmaker (part Romanian-Jewish descent)
 Harvey Keitel – actor and producer (Romanian Jewish mother)
 Tristan Leabu – actor
 Andrea Marcovicci – actress and singer
 Carl Reiner – comedian and actor (Romanian Jewish mother)
 Edward G. Robinson – actor (Romanian-Jewish descent)
 Sebastian Stan – actor
 Johnny Pacar – actor and singer
 Johnny Weissmuller – Olympic swimmer, water polo player and actor
 David Pittu – actor
 Natalie Portman – Academy Award-winning actress (part Romanian-Jewish descent)
Ray Wise – actor (Romanian mother)
 Adrian Zmed – actor best known from the T.J. Hooker television series.

Screenwriter, directors and producer of films and theatre 
 Frieda Fishbein – literary and theatrical agent
 Stanley Kubrick – film director, screenwriter, producer and photographer. His father's parents and paternal grandparents were of Romanian Jewish descent. 
 Jean Negulesco – film director and screenwriter
Petru Popescu – screenwriter from Hollywood and best-selling author
 Steve Sabol – film producer and one of the founders of NFL Films
Andrei Șerban – director of theater and opera
 Erwin Stoff – film producer and founder of 3 Arts Entertainment

Singers and musicians 
 Herb Alpert – lead singer, and horn player with Tijuana Brass (Romanian-Jewish descent)
Lucian Ban – jazz piano player, composer
Laura Bretan – soprano singer
Yeat - rapper
Shelby Cinca – punk rock guitarist
 Sergiu Comissiona – conductor and musician
Valery Gaina - guitarist, songwriter, composer
Art Garfunkel – singer, poet, and actor (Romanian-Jewish descent)
Angela Gheorghiu – soprano
 Alma Gluck – soprano
Christina Grimmie – singer
Harloe – singer
Yolanda Marculescu – soprano
Necro – rapper
Margareta Paslaru – singer
Beverly Sills – soprano
Virginia Zeani – opera singer

Sports 
 Fred Arbanas (1939–2021) – American football player 
Nadia Comăneci (born 1961) – Olympic gold medalist in gymnastics (defected to the US in 1989)
 Danny Barbir (born 1998) – soccer player
 Sam Cosmi (born 1999) – American football player 
 Nick Denes (1906–1975) – American football and basketball coach
 Eric Ghiaciuc (born 1981) – American football player 
 John Ghindia (1925–2012) – American football player and coach
Bill Goldberg (born 1966) – American football player and undefeated wrestler (Romanian-Jewish descent). 
Hroniss Grasu (born 1991) – American football player 
Hank Greenberg (1911–1986) – Baseball Hall of Famer (Romanian-Jewish descent).
Lou Groza (1924–2000) – Pro Football Hall of Famer
Ernie Grunfeld (born 1955) – basketball player and former general manager of the Washington Wizards
 Red Holzman (1920–1998) – NBA Hall of Fame coach and former player (Romanian Jewish mother)
 Sabrina Ionescu (born 1997) – basketball player for the New York Liberty; college honors at the University of Oregon include multiple national player of the year awards in 2019 and 2020
 Fred Lebow (1932–1994) – founder of the New York City Marathon 
 Dominique Moceanu (born 1981) – US Olympic gymnast
Corina Morariu (born 1978) – former professional tennis player, reached the world No. 1 ranking in doubles in 2000
Gheorghe Mureșan (born 1971) – former NBA player; lives in USA
Stephen Negoesco (1925–2019) – soccer coach
Betty Okino (born 1975) – US Olympic gymnast
Sam Paulescu (born 1984) – American football player
 Nick Roman (1947–2003) – American football player
Dolph Schayes (1928–2015) – NBA Hall of Famer player and coach
Bud Selig (born 1934) – Commissioner of Major League Baseball
 Charley Stanceu (1916–1969) – baseball player
 Mark Suciu (born 1992) – professional skateboarder
 Otmar Szafnauer (born 1964) – Team Principal of the Alpine F1 Team
Kevin Youkilis (born 1979) – Major League Baseball player; first baseman for the Boston Red Sox

Law
Timothy Stanceu – Chief United States Judge of the United States Court of International Trade
 David Sam - Senior Judge of the United States District Court for the District of Utah

Media/Journalism
 Rukmini Callimachi – journalist, The New York Times
 Harry Caray – former baseball broadcaster
 Chip Caray – sports broadcaster for Fox Sports South
 Liz Claman –  anchor of the Fox Business Network show Countdown to the Closing Bell
 Horace Dediu – technology journalist
 Steve Fainaru – investigative journalist and senior writer for ESPN.com and ESPN The Magazine
 John Florea – photojournalist for Life magazine
 Lisa Kennedy – host of the Kennedy show on the Fox Business Network
 Dan Moldea – author and investigative journalist
 George Puscas – sports reporter for the Detroit Free Press
 Marc Stein – sports reporter for The New York Times (Romanian-Jewish descent)
 Brian Unger – journalist and commentator for NPR

Military 
Nicolae Dunca – captain in the 12th New York Infantry Regiment in the American Civil War
George Pomutz – Brevet Brigadier General, commanded the 15th Iowa Infantry Regiment in the American Civil War
 Eugen Ghica-Comănești – captain in the 5th New York Volunteer Infantry in the American Civil War
Alexander Vraciu – World War II Navy pilot; ace

Politics 
Steven Fulop – current Mayor of Jersey City (Romanian-Jewish descent)
Michael Gruitza – former Democratic member of the Pennsylvania House of Representatives
Chris Lauzen – Illinois state senator of District 25 (1993–2013)
John Rakolta – former United States Ambassador to the United Arab Emirates appointed by Donald Trump
Elizabeth Tamposi – former Assistant Secretary of State for Consular Affairs at the U.S. Department of State (1989–1992)
Adrian Zuckerman – former United States Ambassador to Romania appointed by Donald Trump, first US Ambassador born in Romania

Religion 
John Michael Botean – Romanian Greek-Catholic bishop
Nathaniel Popp – Romanian Orthodox Archbishop
Vasile Louis Puscas – Romanian Greek-Catholic bishop
Alexander Ratiu – former Romanian Greek-Catholic priest and author
Valerian Trifa – former archbishop of Romanian Orthodox Church of America and Canada

Sciences 
Rodica Baranescu – mechanical engineer known for her research in automotive diesel engines
Adrian Bejan – mechanical engineer, Benjamin Franklin Medal Laureate
George de Bothezat – engineer, businessman, and pioneer of helicopter flight
Mircea Dincă – chemist
Diana Fosha – psychologist
Viviana Gradinaru – neuroscientist
Dan Graur – scientist
Liviu Librescu – material scientist, and professor of Engineering Science and Mechanics at Virginia Tech
Horațiu Năstase – physicist and professor in the High energy physics group at Brown University in Providence, RI, USA.
Mihai Nadin – researcher in electrical engineering
George Emil Palade – Nobel Prize-winning biologist
Sergiu Pașca – scientist and physician at Stanford University
Vasile Popov – leading systems theorist and control engineering specialist
Gideon Rodan – biochemist and osteopath
Nicholas Sanduleak – astronomer

Computer science 
Andrei Alexandrescu – computer scientist, worked as a research scientist at Facebook
Andrei Broder – computer scientist and distinguished scientist at Google
Maria-Florina Balcan – computer scientist
Mihaela Cardei – computer scientist and researcher, professor at Florida Atlantic University
Flaviu Cristian – computer scientist, noted for his work in distributed systems
Roxana Geambasu – computer scientist and associate professor of computer science at Columbia University
Virgil Gligor – computer scientist, professor of Electrical and Computer Engineering at Carnegie Mellon University, he has been inducted into the National Cybersecurity Hall of Fame.
Grigore Rosu – computer scientist, professor at the University of Illinois at Urbana-Champaign
Daniela Rus – director of the MIT Computer Science and Artificial Intelligence Laboratory.
Ion Stoica – computer scientist, professor of computer science at the University of California Berkeley and co-director of AMPLab.
Rada Mihalcea – computer scientist, professor of computer science and engineering at the University of Michigan
Anca Mosoiu – computer scientist, credited with helping to build the tech industry in Oakland.
Fabian Pascal – computer scientist, consultant to large software vendors such as IBM, Oracle Corporation, and Borland.
Matei Zaharia – computer scientist, creator of Apache Spark.

Writers 
John Balaban – poet
Matei Călinescu - literary critic and professor of comparative literature at Indiana University, in Bloomington, Indiana.
Ion Cârja – writer and anti-communist activist
Nina Cassian – poet, journalist, film critic
Andrei Codrescu – poet, writer, radio host
Thomas Pavel – literary theorist, critic, and novelist currently teaching at the University of Chicago
Norman Manea – writer
Valery Oișteanu – poet, art critic, writer, essayist, and photographer
Virgil Nemoianu – essayist, literary critic, and philosopher of culture
Michael Radu – political writer
Saviana Stănescu – writer (poet, playwright)
Dorin Tudoran – poet, writer, journalist

Comics writers
 Will Eisner – comics writer, artist, and entrepreneur (Romanian-Jewish descent)
 Sandu Florea – illustrator, comic book, and comic strip creator
 Elena Kucharik – illustrator
 Stan Lee – comic book writer, editor, publisher and former president and chairman of Marvel Comics (Romanian-Jewish descent)
 Saul Steinberg – cartoonist and illustrator (Romanian-Jewish descent)

Others 
George Barris – photographer best known for his photographs of Marilyn Monroe
Scarlett Bordeaux (born 1991) – WWE wrestler
Alexandra Botez – chess player
Catherine Caradja – philanthropist, aristocrat, Romanian expatriate to the U.S.
Misha Gabriel – dancer and choreographer
Serban Ghenea – mixing engineer, who has recorded and mixed tracks for artists including Adele, Stevie Wonder, Rod Stewart,  Bruno Mars, Taylor Swift and many more
Joe Oros – automobile designer for the Ford Motor Company
Ion Mihai Pacepa – general of Securitate
Mircea Răceanu – diplomat
Vladimir Tismăneanu – specialist in political systems and comparative politics
George W. Trippon – fashion designer and television host

See also
Romanian Canadians

References

American people of Romanian descent
Romanian-American
Romanian
Americans
Romanian American